The Great Taste Coffee Makers were a basketball team that played in the Philippine Basketball Association (PBA) from 1975 to 1992. It was one of the founding members of the PBA, the Asia's first and oldest professional league.  The franchise was owned by CFC Corporation (now merged with Universal Robina Corporation) and named after its brand of instant coffee, Great Taste Coffee. The franchise also played under other CFC brands such as N-Rich, Presto and Tivoli.

The franchise won six PBA championships, mostly under coach Baby Dalupan.

In 1993, CFC sold its PBA franchise to Sta. Lucia Realty & Development, Inc., which absorbed several Presto players.

History

Early years (1975-1978)

While Great Taste was known to be a blockbuster and powerhouse team to those who got to watch the game in the early 1980s, this team was also one of the ragtag and also-ran teams of the 1970s. Not exactly blessed with the biggest names among the present set of players then, they did become competitive owing more on the sheer hearts of their players rather than talents. Having started in the MICAA under coach Narciso Bernardo in 1973, notable players who donned the Presto/Great Taste jersey in the 70s included the Aldanese brothers Noli and Jing (who replaced Fely Fajardo as coach in the second conference of 1976), Manny Paner, Florendo Ritualo (the father of Ren-Ren), Danny Pribhdas (the father of Danilo, Jr of the UST Growling Tigers), and Johnny Revilla. Coaches included Tony Genato (Quinito Henson's father in law), Chino Marquinez (who also acted as team manager) and Nilo Verona.

Breakthrough (1979-1982)

In the second conference of 1979, the ballclub finally cracked into the final four behind imports Jim Hearns and Darryl Smith, the following year with the acquisition of Jun Papa and Estoy Estrada, the team made it anew in the semifinals of the Open Conference. In the mid-season of 1981, they signed center-forwards Manny Victorino and Joel Banal, that same year, the team had their first player to win an award in Rafael "Cho' Sison, voted the 1981 Rookie of the Year. The final conference of both 1981 and 1982 season had the ballclub figured in a playoff for a finals berth but fell short each time.

The Ricardo Brown era (1983-1987)

The real big turnaround started when they were able to secure the services of then Filipino-American rookie Ricardo Brown. It is said that Brown was practically stolen by Great Taste team manager Ignacio Gotao from Crispa owner Danny Floro, who has already formalized a commitment from the "Quick Brown Fox" to play for the Redmanizers. But as fate would have it, Brown was secured for the Coffeemakers, along with Bogs Adornado from the disbanded U-Tex Wranglers, and with Manny Victorino (then considered one of 3 elite centers in the league, alongside Ramon Fernandez and Abet Guidaben), Joel Banal, Alejo Alolor, Joy Carpio, and import Norman Black. Great Taste finally enter into the championship picture, losing to the Billy Ray Bates-led Crispa in the second conference finals. The real sweetener happen in the third conference with the entry of Coach Baby Dalupan for the team - first as team consultant behind his godson Jimmy Mariano, only to secure the top coaching job when Mariano was "fired" for his ill-advised statement "we didn't intend to win.” This was said after a shocking loss to lowly Galerie Dominique since Great Taste was already secured of a slot in the next round.

Now a powerful and potent squad, Great Taste became the toast of the PBA in the following year, acquiring players such as Arnie Tuadles, Frankie Lim and Chito Loyzaga and in 1985, signing Abe King and Willie Pearson. The Coffeemakers dominated the mid-1980s, winning four straight championships between 1984 and 1985, with a strong local lineup and a more potent imports in the likes of Joe Binion and Jeff Collins.

The Allan Caidic era (1987-1992)

After a crownless season in 1986, the team decided to trade two of its key players; Manny Victorino and Jimmy Manansala to Shell for Philip Cezar and Bernie Fabiosa, and with Atoy Co joining the team following the disbandment of the Manila Beer franchise, the three former Crispa players had a reunion of sorts with Great Taste with their coach Baby Dalupan. 

Add to this the blue chip rookie in the draft in the name of Allan Caidic and they became the team to beat. Great Taste regains the All-Filipino crown that year and won their fifth championship. The following season, their franchise player Ricardo Brown left the team and signed with San Miguel Beer.

Presto won its final championship in 1990 featuring the superstar veteran Allan Caidic (named Most Valuable Player of the Year) and rookies Gerald Esplana (named Rookie of the Year) and Apet Jao (the top draft pick). More blue chip players came their way including Bong Hawkins in 1991 and Vergel Meneses in 1992 until the team eventually disbanded at the end of the 1992 season with Sta. Lucia buying the franchise rights including its rights for the first pick of the 1993 draft.

Season-by-season records

Awards

Individual awards

All-Star Weekend

Notable players

PBA Greatest players
In alphabetical order. Members of PBA Hall of Fame are in boldface.
William "Bogs" Adornado #33
Ricardo Brown #23 - "The Quick Brown Fox" named 1985 PBA Most Valuable Player
Allan Caidic #8 - "The Triggerman" named 1987 PBA Rookie of the Year & 1990 PBA Most Valuable Player
Philip Cezar #18 - "The Scholar"
Atoy Co #60 and #6 - "The Fortune Cookie" played his final years in the league with the team.
Bernie Fabiosa #15 - "The Sultan of Swipe"
Vergel Meneses #4 - "The Aerial Voyager" was the #1 draft pick of the 1992 draft.
Manny Paner #5 & #13 - Became the highest paid Filipino player in 1977, signed a 4-year contract called for P 8,000 a month.

Other notable players

Jose "Jing" Aldanese #4
Manuel "Noli" Aldanese #11
Teodocio "Teddy" Alfarero #20+
Alejo "Pongkee" Alolor #2
Leonardo "Leo" Aranzaso #9
Cesar "Kia" Arpilleda #17
Woodrow Balani #19
Joel Banal #26, #6, #7 & #28
Danilo "Danny" Basilan #14
Santiago "Sonny" Cabatu #5
Bernardo "Joy" Carpio #29 - "The Scavenger" 
Israel "Ric" Catacutan #15
Jacinto" Bong" Chua #8 & #9+
Aurelio "Boy" Clarino #56
 Fortunato "Atoy" Co Jr. #6 #60 - "The Fortune Cookie" 
Arturo "Bai" Cristobal #7
Carlito "Lito" Cruz #12
Oliveros "Nonoy" Dalman #3
Ramon "Onchie" Dela Cruz #9
Danilo "Danny" De Guzman #10
Valeriano "Botchok" Delos Santos #10+
Hernani "Nani Demegillo #15
Jaime "Jimmy" Dungca #6
Gerald "Gerry" Esplana #14 - 1990 PBA Rookie of the Year - "Mr. Cool" 
Ernesto "Estoy" Estrada+ #6 & #44
Reynaldo "Rey" Franco #20
Wilfredo "Willy" Generalao #42 - "The General"
Filomeno "Fil" Gulfin #8
Noel Guzman #8
Rene "Bong" Hawkins Jr.  #16 - "The Hawk"
Arthur "Art" Herrera #8
Federico "Padim" Israel #17
Peter "Apet" Jao #5 - #1 draft pick of 1990 PBA Draft
 - “The Howitser"
Alfredo "Pido" Jarencio #25 - "The Fireman"
Woodrow "Totoy" Jaymalin #5
Alfonso "Al" Jovero #12
Abraham "Abe" King #6 #66 - "The Chairman of the Board"
Francisco "Frankie" Lim #22
Joaquin "Chito" Loyzaga #41 - "The Dynamite"
Jaime "Jimmy" Manansala #11
 Joselito "Joey" Marquez #66
Manuel "Totoy" Marquez #71
Eduardo "Eddieboy" Mendoza #10
Lawrence "Tata" Merced #18
Jose Cadel Mosqueda #12
Ruben "Benjie" Pablo #6
Adriano "Jun" Papa, Jr. #55+
Leonardo "Leo" Paguntalan #16
Willie Pearson #33
Danilo "Danny" Pribhdas, Jr+(father of Danilo, Jr. of the UST Growling Tigers) #13
Zaldy Realubit #28
Johnny Revilla #16+
Florendo  "Dante" Ritualo #20 / #11+
Ranulfo "Noni" Robles #16
Ricafort "Ric" Roces #15
Jose "Joe" Roslin #19 & #14
Rafael "Cho" Sison #12
Loreto" Ato"Tolentino #7
Tomasito "Sito" Tolentino #5
Oscar "Oca" Tuazon #19
 Arnulfo "Arnie Tuadles"  #11 & #22+
Redentor "Red" Vicente, Sr. #45
Manny Victorino #1

Imports

Rich Adams #32 (1982)
George Almones #32 (1988)
Terrance Bailey #21 (1989 & 1991)
Joe Binion #30 (1985)
Norman Black #24 (1983)
Cory Blackwell #30 (1985)
Michael Britt #21 (1985)
Johnny Brown #3 (1986)
Lewis "Lew" Brown #24 (1980)
Derwin "Tank" Collins #3 (1992)
James Collins #13 (1978)
Jeff Collins #24 (1984)
Winston Crite #31 (1990)
Perry Davis #30 (1982)
Kenny Fields #54 (1988)
Alvin Franklin #20 (1986)
Jerome Harmon #32 (1992)
Jim Hearns #33 (1979 & 1980)
Michael Holton #14 (1986)
Lewis Jackson #24 (1986)
Harold Johnson #33 (1981)
Napoleon Johnson #00 (1985) 
Greg Jones #3 (1986)
Darryl "Choo" Kennedy #30 (1987)
Dana Lewis #3 (1977)

Lew Massey #23 (1981)
Dwayne McClain #44 (1991)
Dwight Moody #(1987 PBA/IBA series)
Cisco Oliver #6 (1978)
Myles Patrick #32 (1981)
Wally Rank #21 (1985)
Eldridge Recasner #7 (1992)
Angelo Robinson #34 (1984)
Walker Russell #3 (1989)
Danny Salisbery #31 (1982)
Niño Samuel #44 (1977)
Dawan Scott #7 (1983)
Dexter Shouse (1987 PBA/IBA series)
Darryl Smith #68 (1979)
Everette Stephens #21 (1990)
Earl Tatum #42 (1981)
Jeff Taylor #44 (1987)
Charles Thompson #18 (1983)
Eric Turner #12 (1986)
Tony White #4 (1988)
Mike Wilson #2 (1986)
Ennis Whatley
Joey Wright #5 (1992)
Michael Young #42 (1987)

Coaches
Tony Genato
Nilo Verona
Alfonso Marquez
Baby Dalupan
Jimmy Mariano
Tommy Manotoc

Team managers
Ignacio Gotao
Chino Marquinez

References

External links
The Quick Brown Fox's Untold Stories@GMA News Online

 
Basketball teams established in 1975
Basketball teams disestablished in 1992
Defunct Philippine Basketball Association teams
1975 establishments in the Philippines
1992 disestablishments in the Philippines